Cowdenbeath is one of the 22 wards used to elect members of Fife Council. The ward elects four Councillors, covering the town of Cowdenbeath as well as the nearby villages of Crossgates, Hill of Beath, Kelty, and Lumphinnans.

Councillors

Election Results

2022 Election
2022 Fife Council election

2017 Election

2014 By-election
A by-election was held after Jane Baxter became an MSP.

2012 Election

2007 Election

References

Wards of Fife
Kelty
Cowdenbeath
Hill of Beath